This is a list of television broadcasters which provide coverage of the Nemzeti Bajnokság I, Hungarian football's top level competition.

International broadcasters

Europe (UEFA) 

Association football on television